Christian Lüscher (born April 13, 1963) is a Swiss neurobiologist and full professor at the Department of Basic Neurosciences of the University of Geneva. He is also an attending in neurology at the Geneva University Hospital. Lüscher is known for his contributions in the field addiction, particularly for establishing links of causality between the drug-evoked synaptic plasticity and adaptive behavior in mice.

Early life 
Lüscher was born in Bern, Switzerland and grew up there in the lake of Constance area.

Education 
Lüscher studied medicine in Lausanne and Berne and obtained his federal diploma in 1990. In his MD degree, he studied the effects of axon morphology on action potential propagation. After clinical residencies at the Inselspital in Bern and the University Hospital in Geneva, he left for a postdoctoral fellowship at UCSF (Advisor Roger Nicoll). He returned to University of Geneva with a career development award of the Swiss National Science Foundation, where he first became associated (2003) and then full professor (2009)

Research 
Lüscher studies how addictive drugs alter synaptic transmission in the reward system of the mouse brain. He has proposed a mechanistic classification of addictive drugs and developed optogenetic stimulation protocols that when applied in a mouse model of addiction can erase adaptive behavior. In his most recent work he explores the molecular basis of individual vulnerability to addiction and launched several translational projects. He has initiated the OptoDBS conference series, seeking to emulate optogenetic innervations with deep brain stimulation.

Lüscher also studies the circuits underlying hedonic feeding. He has observed that suppression of activity of D1 receptor expression medium spiny neurons that project to the lateral hypothalamus (LH) authorizes food intake. Moreover synaptic depression of GABA transmission in the LH leads to overeating. the same circuits are also controlling the social transmission of a food safety signal.

Among others, Lüscher has mentored the following scientists, who are now independent investigators: Camilla Bellone (Associate Professor University of Geneva), Meaghan Creed (Assistant Professor, Washington University in St. Louis), Manuel Mameli (Associate Professor, University of Lausanne), Tifei Yuan (Associate Professor, Shanghai Jiao Tong University, CN)

Awards and honors 

2022   Chica and Heinz Schaller Foundation Award in Translational Neuroscience Chica and Heinz Schaller Foundation
2020   ERC European Research Council Advanced Grant
2020   Otto Naegeli Prize
2019   Schaefer Research Scholar, Columbia University
2017	Théodore Ott Prize of Swiss Academy of Medical Sciences
2016	Betty and David Koetser Award for Brain Research
2015-	Member American College of Neuropsychopharmacology
2015-	Member Senate of Swiss Academy of Medical Sciences
2013   ERC European Research Council Advanced Grant
2010	Cloëtta Prize

Key papers

References

External links 

1963 births
Living people
Academic staff of the University of Geneva
Swiss biologists
Scientists from Bern
Swiss neuroscientists